Schildau is a small town in the district Nordsachsen, in the Free State of Saxony, Germany. It is located 12 km southwest of Torgau and 40 km east of Leipzig. Since 1 January 2013, it is part of the town Belgern-Schildau.

Notable people 
 August Neidhardt von Gneisenau (1760-1831), Prussian field marshal

References 

Nordsachsen
Former municipalities in Saxony